Massachusetts House of Representatives' 13th Norfolk district in the United States is one of 160 legislative districts included in the lower house of the Massachusetts General Court. It covers part of Norfolk County. Democrat Denise Garlick of Needham has represented the district since 2011.

Towns represented
The district includes the following localities:
 Dover
 part of Medfield
 Needham

The current district geographic boundary overlaps with those of the Massachusetts Senate's Bristol and Norfolk district, Norfolk and Suffolk district, and Norfolk, Bristol and Middlesex district.

Former locales
The district previously covered:
 Bellingham, circa 1872 
 Franklin, circa 1872

Representatives
 Stephen W. Richardson, circa 1858 
 Horace Rockwood, circa 1859 
 Jack H. Backman, 1965-1970 
 John A. Businger, 1971-1974 
 Michael Dukakis
 Charles M. McGowan, circa 1975 
 Denise C. Garlick, 2011-current

See also
 List of Massachusetts House of Representatives elections
 Other Norfolk County districts of the Massachusetts House of Representatives: 1st, 2nd, 3rd, 4th, 5th, 6th, 7th, 8th, 9th, 10th, 11th, 12th, 14th, 15th
 List of Massachusetts General Courts
 List of former districts of the Massachusetts House of Representatives

Images
Portraits of legislators

References

External links
 Ballotpedia
  (State House district information based on U.S. Census Bureau's American Community Survey).
 League of Women Voters of Needham

House
Government of Norfolk County, Massachusetts